The Allison Bus Series are medium and heavy duty automatic transmissions for transit buses and highway motorcoaches designed and manufactured by Allison Transmission. Each of the six models in the Bus Series is available in 5 or 6 speeds with an integral hydraulic retarder as an option.

History
In 2015, Allison introduced a new model in the Bus Series. Part of the xFE (extra fuel economy) line, the B3400xFE incorporates optimized gear ratios and features the FuelSense® Max electronic control package. New gear ratios also allow the torque converter to lock up at lower speeds. The xFE transmissions boast an up to seven percent improvement in fuel economy over baseline models.

, the majority of the 5,700 buses operated by the New York City Transit Authority are equipped with Allison B400 or B500 transmissions.

Models 
Allison markets its transmissions by vocational series according to the intended use; for example, the Tractor Series is sold for and installed in Class 8 tractors, while the Motorhome Series is marketed to manufacturers of recreational vehicles. A transmission is given a designation specific to the vocational series, but is otherwise identical mechanically to other transmissions sold for other vocational series; for example, the Bus Series B210 / B220 / B295 transmissions are also sold with identical gearing as:

 1000HS (Highway Series)
 1000MH (Motorhome Series)
 1000EVS (Emergency Vehicle Series)
 1000RDS (Rugged Duty Series)
 1000PTS (Pupil Transport/Shuttle Series)
 1000SP (Specialty Series)
 1350HS/MH/EVS/RDS/PTS/SP
 2100HS/MH/EVS/RDS/PTS/SP
 2200HS/MH/EVS/RDS/PTS/SP
 2350HS/MH/EVS/RDS/PTS/SP

Collectively, these are grouped into the 1000/2000 Series transmission family; transmissions within a family share the same basic dimensions, power input capabilities, and weight. Allison transmission families for the Bus Series include the 1000/2000 Series (B210, B220, B295), 3000 Series (B300 / B400), and 4000 Series (B500).

Within North America, Bus Series transmissions carry a "B" prefix to distinguish them from other vocational series transmissions manufactured by Allison. Outside of North America, the equivalent transmissions are designated with a "T" prefix, e.g., T3280 xFE, T3325 xFE, and T3375 xFE.

References

Automobile transmissions